The Montréal Mission (or, the "Mission") is a ringette team in Canada's National Ringette League (NRL) competing in the Eastern Conference in the White division. The team was founded in 2004. The team gathers its players from the region of Montreal, Quebec and plays its home games at Centre Étienne Desmarteau.

The "Mission" is one of the NRL's most successful teams from Quebec. During the Covid-19 pandemic, the team did not compete in the NRL Championships. In the past the Mission also competed against Bourassa Royal before that NRL team was discontinued.

Team history

The Montréal Mission, or, "the Mission", is a ringette team in the National Ringette League from Quebec which first formed in 2004. It is Quebec's NRL team with the best record in the league's history. The team was previously ranked second in the Eastern Conference of the National Ringette League behind one of Ontario's teams, the Cambridge Turbos. The Mission finished in second place for two NRL seasons: 2010-11 and 2009-10. In 2008-09, the team ended its season at the top of the NRL standings for the NRL Eastern Conference with two points more than the Cambridge Turbos.

In 2006 the team acquired Anna Vanhatalo, "The Montreal Mission is proud to welcome Anna Vanhatalo to its family. Anna is an exchange student at the University of Montreal and a valued member of the Mission team." Vanhatalo played for the Mission for one season. Her  team in Finland, Helsinki Ringette, received Montreal Mission goalkeeper Claudia Jetté in exchange.

League competition 2022–23 season

In 2022–23, the NRL entered its 18th season with thirteen teams competing:

Western Conference
 BC Thunder
 Edmonton Black Gold Rush
 Edmonton WAM!
 Calgary RATH
 Saskatchewan Heat
 Manitoba Herd

Eastern Conference Red
 Nepean Ravens
 Waterloo Wildfire
 Gatineau Fusion
 Cambridge Turbos

Eastern Conference White
 Montreal Mission
 Rive-Sud Révolution
 Atlantic Attack

Leading scorers 

In 2009-2010, two Montreal Mission players dominated the National Ringette League standings in scoring: Catherine Cartier with 122 points (1st), and 110 points for Julie Blanchette (2nd). In  addition,  made 83 points placing 4th. In 2010-11, the two players dominating the standings of the league for scores and assists where the Mission's Blanchette with 141 points placing 1st, and 132 points for Cartier who finished in 2nd.

Regular season records

Playoff records

Rosters

2022-23
The following is the roster for the 2022–23 National Ringette League season.

2011-12
The following is the roster for the 2011–2012 National Ringette League season.

Coaching staff
    General Manager: France Levert
    Head Coach: 	 Daniel Dussault

World Championship connection
Several players from the Montréal Mission have been chosen to represent Canada for the World Ringette Championships. Some players have also become coaches for the Canada national ringette team.

Players
Canada's World Ringette Championship teams have included these notable players:

Coaches
Canada's World Ringette Championship teams have included these players turned coach:

Other teams
The Montreal Mission have competed against a number of other NRL teams including the Bourassa Royal, Cambridge Turbos, Calgary RATH, Rive-Sud Révolution, and the Atlantic Attack.

Gallery

See also

 Ringette
 National Ringette League
 Cambridge Turbos
 Atlantic Attack
 Bourassa Royal
 Calgary RATH
 Rive-Sud Révolution

References

External links 
The former official website of the Montreal Mission 
The official website of the National Ringette League 
Ringette Canada
  Ringette Canada, archived wepage
 National Ringette League announces annual award winners
 2009-10 Season Statistiques
 2010-11 Season Statistiques
 2011 Championship Statistiques
 2011-2012 Season Statistiques

National Ringette League
NRL
Ringette
Sports teams in Montreal
Women's sports teams
Women's sports teams in Canada